Douglas Moore (1893–1969) was an American composer, educator, and author.

Douglas Moore may also refer to:

Doug Moore (1939–2016), Canadian politician
Douglas E. Moore (1928–2019), American minister and civil rights activist
Douglas Moore (1948–1969), U.S. Army soldier killed in the Vietnam War, the namesake of Moore Army Airfield
Douglas Moore (football manager), New Zealand former manager of the Singapore national football team 
Douglas R. Moore, 9th President of Minnesota State University, Mankato